The Salazar Valley is a valley in the east of the Foral Community of Navarre in Spain. It lies within the Merindad of Zangoza-Sangüesa and within that, the Comarca of Roncal-Salazar. The Sierra de Abodi, part of the Western Pyrenees, forms the natural boundary in the north. There is a ski resort in Abodi.

Etymology 
The first mention of the name was in documents of the Monastery of Leire, with the denomination of Sarasazo (924). Later Sarasazu (1055), Sarasaz (1111 and 1469), Sarasaitz (1205) especially in texts written in Latin.

Zaraitzu seems to derivate from an older form: Sarasaitzu.

The Castilian official denomination began being used widely in the 17th century probably influenced by the Salazar surname, famous in the Nobility of the Iberian Peninsula. In fact Salazar is not a common surname in Navarre, but it is very common in the west of the Basque Country, which indicates its origins.

Zaraitzu Basque 
The local Basque language dialect was the Salazarese, although nowadays Spanish among the elder population and Spanish and Euskara Batua between younger generations is spoken. However, the last publications of works about the Basque of Zaraitzu (dictionary, learning method, text collection and oral recordings) and some courses of this dialect in the valley have been addressed to the local population in order to maintain it to some extent.

Municipalities 

The traditional names of the towns are in brackets.
Uscarrés (Uskartze)
Esparza de Salazar (Espartza Zaraitzu/Esparza)
Ezcároz (Ezkaroze)
Gallués (Galoze)
Güesa (Gorza)
Ibilcieta (Ibiltzieta/Ibizta)
Iciz (Izize)
Igal (Igari)
Izal (Itzalle)
Izalzu (Itzaltzu)
Ochagavía (Otsagabia/Otsagi)
Oronz (Orontze)
Sarriés (Sartze)
Jaurrieta (Eaurta)

Demographics

References

External links

Salazar Valley site

Valleys of Spain
Comarcas of Navarre
Landforms of Navarre